The 1986 World Women's Curling Championship, the women's world curling championship, was held from March 23–29 at the Kelowna Memorial Arena in Kelowna, British Columbia, Canada.

Canada, skipped by Marilyn Darte (also known as Marilyn Bodogh-Darte at the time) won the gold medal, easily defeating West Germany, skipped by Andrea Schöpp in the final, 12–5. It was the third consecutive world championship for Canada. The Darte rink won the game thanks to steals of two in the third, four in the sixth and a single in the seventh. Canada took a 2–1 lead after Darte drew to the button in second end to score two. They then stole three in the next end after Schöpp was heavy on a draw. The teams then traded singles in the fourth and fifth The steal of four in the sixth came as a result of a missed wick attempt by Schöpp, when she ended up just brushing off a Canadian stone, and rolling out of the rings, to go down 2–9. Schöpp conceded the game after nine ends. It was the first time West Germany had made the final in the women's championship. The teams played in front of about 2,000 spectators.

Teams

Round-robin standings

Round-robin results

Draw 1

Draw 2

Draw 3

Draw 4

Draw 5

Draw 6

Draw 7

Draw 8

Draw 9

Tiebreakers

Playoffs

Semifinals

Bronze medal game

Final

References

 

World Women's Curling Championship
1986 in Canadian curling
Curling in British Columbia
Sport in Kelowna
1986 in British Columbia
1986 in women's curling
March 1986 sports events in Canada
Women's curling competitions in Canada
Sports competitions in British Columbia
International sports competitions hosted by Canada
1986 in Canadian women's sports